Connie Francis sings Award Winning Motion Picture Hits is a studio album recorded by American pop singer Connie Francis.

Background
In April 1962, Connie Francis was working mostly in Europe, recording several German language songs at Austrophon Studio, located in the basement of the Konzerthaus in Vienna. Between April 26 and 28, Francis spent three days in Rome, recording a set of thirteen songs intended for an album of  Academy Award-winning songs  with the rather lengthy title Connie Francis sings Award Winning Motion Picture Hits:

"All the Way" from The Joker Is Wild (1957)
"Buttons and Bows" from The Paleface (1948)
"High Hopes" from A Hole in the Head (1959)
"Lullaby of Broadway" from Gold Diggers of 1935 (1935)
"Moon River" from Breakfast at Tiffany's (1961)
"Over the Rainbow" from The Wizard of Oz (1939)
"The Last Time I Saw Paris" from Lady Be Good (1941)
"The Way You Look Tonight" from Swing Time (1936)
"Secret Love" from Calamity Jane (1953)
"Whatever Will Be, Will Be (Qué Será, Será)" from The Man Who Knew Too Much (1956)
"When You Wish upon a Star" from Pinocchio (1940)
"You'll Never Know" from Hello, Frisco, Hello (1943)
"Zip-a-Dee-Dooh-Dah" from Song of the South (1946)

The playbacks to these songs had been pre-recorded at EMI's famous Abbey Road Studios in London under the supervision of Francis' British producer Norman Newell and were conducted by Geoff Love. The tapes of these playbacks had been shipped to Rome, where Francis overdubbed her vocals at RCA Italiana Studios. Francis was unsatisfied with the results and it was decided to postpone the album's release which had originally been planned for early summer of 1962.

The album remained in the vaults until March 1963. When Francis decided to record the winning song from the 1963 Academy Award ceremony, "Days of Wine and Roses," plans were made to include this recording to the set of songs from the 1962 sessions. Yet, Francis still was not satisfied with the whole album and asked orchestra leader Don Costa - who had arranged and conducted her # 1 hit "Don't Break the Heart That Loves You" in November 1961 and was also in charge of Francis' recording of "Days of Wine and Roses" -  to create and record new playbacks for the 1962 recordings while keeping Francis' original vocals.

Between March 15 and April 4, 1963, Costa recorded new playbacks to twelve of the thirteen songs; some of them even underwent a second treatment until Francis was finally satisfied with the results. The recording of "Over the Rainbow" was heavily edited by removing the repetition of the second verse and cutting down its running time from 3:46 minutes to 2:38 minutes. One track, however, was left untouched, "Buttons and Bows" from the motion picture The Paleface, and remained completely unreleased until 1996.

The remaining twelve songs were combined with "Days of Wine and Roses," and the album was finally released in May 1963 in the U. S. as MGM Records 12" Album SE-4048 (stereo) and E-4048 (mono).

In Australia (Cat.-No. S 027592) and New Zealand (Cat.-No. MCS 5017), though, it came to a mix-up of mastertapes. Here the original 1962 recordings from Rome were released with Days of Wine and Roses missing.

In Brazil, the album was released under the title Connie Francis canta Témas premiadas do Cinema. It featured the same track listing as the U. S. edition.

Track listing US-Edition with new 1963 Playbacks

Side A

Side B

Track listing New Zealand and Australia edition with original 1962 Playbacks

Side A

Side B

Not included songs from the sessions

Foreign-language versions
In 1966, Francis recorded German versions of Over the Rainbow and Moon River for her German concept album Melodien, die die Welt erobern, overdubbing her German vocals to the original 1962 playbacks.

References

External links
Official Connie Francis Fan Club Site

Connie Francis albums
1963 albums
MGM Records albums
Albums produced by Norman Newell
Albums produced by Don Costa
Albums conducted by Geoff Love
Albums conducted by Don Costa
Albums produced by Danny Davis (country musician)